Janitschek is a surname, a Germanized spelling of Czech/Slovak surname Janíček. Notable people with the surname include:

Hans Janitschek (1934–2008), Austrian writer
Hubert Janitschek (1846–1893), Austrian-German art historian
Maria Janitschek, née Tölk (1859–1927), German writer of Austrian origin

German-language surnames
Czech-language surnames
Slovak-language surnames